Kate Alexandra Heffernan (born 7 October 1999) is a New Zealand netballer and cricketer. In netball, she currently plays for Southern Steel in wing defence, centre and wing attack. In 2021, she received her maiden call up to the New Zealand national netball team, and made her debut for the side in 2022, at the Commonwealth Games. In cricket, she played as a left-arm medium bowler for Otago, as well as making two Twenty20 International appearances for New Zealand.

Sporting career

Cricket
Heffernan played domestic cricket for Otago between 2016–17 and 2018–19. She made her Twenty20 International (WT20I) debut for New Zealand against the West Indies on 16 March 2018.

Netball
Heffernan is a member of the ANZ Premiership netball team the Southern Steel.  She was promoted into the team in June 2018 as a replacement for injured team member Dani Gray as midcourt cover for the likes of Shannon Francois and Wendy Frew.  She was a member of the 2018 ANZ Premiership title winning team which beat the Central Pulse in the final.  Heffernan did not take the court however.  From the talent she showed, Heffernan was named in the New Zealand national netball team Development Squad as a result of her Beko Netball League and ANZ Premiership form.

On 10 August 2021, Heffernan was named in the Silver Ferns squad for the first time by coach Noeline Taurua. She was at her family farm in Tapanui with teammate Tiana Metuarau when both received their maiden call-ups. Having already played international cricket, Heffernan became a double international when she made her debut for the Silver Ferns, in July 2022 against Northern Ireland at the Commonwealth Games. Heffernan went on to win a bronze medal as part of the Silver Ferns squad at the 2022 Commonwealth Games.

Personal life
Heffernan has an identical twin sister, Georgia, who has also played both cricket and netball, for Otago and the Southern Steel respectively. The two have played sport together from a young age with Georgia joining Kate in the Steel setup in 2020. The twins' mother Annette Heffernan was also a top-level international netballer for the Silver Ferns. She made her debut as Silver Fern #76 in 1985. Kate has cited her as playing a "massive role" in her netball.

References

External links
 
 

1999 births
Living people
Sportspeople from Invercargill
New Zealand women cricketers
New Zealand women Twenty20 International cricketers
Otago Sparks cricketers
ANZ Premiership players
New Zealand netball players
Southern Steel players
National Netball League (New Zealand) players
Netball players at the 2022 Commonwealth Games
Commonwealth Games bronze medallists for New Zealand
Commonwealth Games medallists in netball
Medallists at the 2022 Commonwealth Games